Encephalartos equatorialis is a species of cycad that is found on two granite hills on the eastern shore of Thurston Bay, Lake Victoria, Uganda at elevations up to 1000 meters.

Description
The stem is 3.5–4 m tall for a diameter of 35–45 cm.

The leaves are rigid, 3–4 m long and 30–40 cm broad, dark green, with a petiole up to 13 mm long. The leaflets depart from the rachis at an angle of 30°, are up to 20-25 cm long and about 20 mm wide.

It is a dioecious species, has conical male cones of 30–40 cm in length and 9–10 cm in diameter with oblong microsporophylls of 20–30 mm in size by 10–15 mm and ovoid female cones 35–40 cm long by a diameter of 18–20 cm with rhomboid macrosporophylls with sides of sides 55 mm for 60 mm and height 30 mm.

The seeds, about 200 per cone, are ellipsoidal in shape, 35–38 mm long by 23–30 mm in diameter, with an orange-red sarcotesta

References

External links
 
 

equatorialis
Plants described in 1995
Endemic flora of Uganda